"Look Away" is a 1988 power ballad by American rock band Chicago. Written by Diane Warren, produced by Ron Nevison, and with Bill Champlin on lead vocals, it is the second single from the band's album Chicago 19. "Look Away" topped the Billboard Hot 100 for two weeks in December 1988, matching the chart success of the group's "If You Leave Me Now" (1976) and "Hard to Say I'm Sorry" (1982). "Look Away" is Chicago's seventh song to have peaked at No. 1 on the Adult Contemporary chart as well as the No. 1 song on the 1989 year-end Billboard Hot 100 chart, even though it never held the No. 1 spot at all in 1989.

The song is the band's only No. 1 single following the 1985 departure of Peter Cetera.

Production
According to drummer Danny Seraphine, Chicago's manager Howard Kaufman suggested that the band bring in outside songwriting help. Kaufman recommended Diane Warren, who also composed the band's single "I Don't Wanna Live Without Your Love," and producer Ron Nevison, who had worked with Heart on the number one hits "These Dreams" and "Alone."

Warren wrote "Look Away" from the man's perspective and submitted a demo to Chicago's management company. "Diane's demos always sound really good," Nevison said. "Her demos are always very simple, but they always have great vocal performances." Bassist Jason Scheff remarked, "The songs that last for me are the ones I don't get at first," and added, "I remember hearing 'Look Away' and thinking it's okay, but not great. Thank God I'm not an A&R man."

Before being submitted to Chicago, the song was one of two ballads offered by Epic Records to Cheap Trick, who chose "The Flame" instead. The track was also offered to Europe, but was turned down due to frontman Joey Tempest's refusal to record material written by outside writers.

The song featured Bill Champlin on lead vocals and furthered Chicago's shift towards de-emphasizing the band's brass section compared to their earlier years. Scheff noted that with Peter Cetera having left the group and "making his own records, it was good for us to release some songs with a different sound (like) Bill's voice. Then we wouldn't be saturating radio with Chicago-sounding songs."

Reception

"Look Away" entered the U.S. Billboard Hot 100 singles chart in September 1988 and reached No. 1, where it spent two weeks, in December. Champlin said he was unaware of the feat at the time. "Everybody said, 'I hear your song every day,'" he recalled. "I go, 'What song?' I was kind of oblivious to the whole thing, busy working on new stuff. That's what happens. As everybody else gets aware of what you're doing, you're usually about five or six tunes past it." The single was certified gold in January and ranked No. 1 on the 1989 Billboard Year-End singles chart. It also reached No. 1 on the Adult Contemporary chart.

Outside the U.S., "Look Away" peaked at No. 1 in Canada, No. 10 in the Netherlands, No. 15 in Sweden, and No. 20 in Belgium.

In 2018 a British man claimed he is the author of the song and launched legal proceedings.

Track listing
7" Vinyl; Cassette

Charts and certifications

Weekly charts

Year-end charts

All-time charts

Certifications

See also
List of Hot Adult Contemporary number ones of 1988

References

1988 songs
1988 singles
Chicago (band) songs
Billboard Hot 100 number-one singles
Cashbox number-one singles
Songs written by Diane Warren
Rock ballads
1980s ballads
RPM Top Singles number-one singles
Song recordings produced by Ron Nevison
Full Moon Records singles
Reprise Records singles
Songs involved in plagiarism controversies